Valborg Olive Engesæter Madslien (born 1 July 1973) is a Norwegian ski-orienteering competitor.

She competed at the 1994 World Ski Orienteering Championships in Val di Non and won a silver medal with the Norwegian relay team, which consisted of herself, Anne Marit Korsvold and Hilde Gjermundshaug Pedersen.

At the 1998 World Ski Orienteering Championships in Windischgarsten she won a bronze medal with the Norwegian relay team, which consisted of herself, Hanne Sletner and Hilde Gjermundshaug Pedersen.

Madslien is four times Norwegian champion in ski orienteering (twice individual champion and twice on relay).

She resides in Lillehammer.

References

Norwegian orienteers
Female orienteers
Ski-orienteers
1973 births
Living people
20th-century Norwegian women
21st-century Norwegian women